Walter Pilkey (1936–2007) was  a professor of mechanical engineering at University of Virginia. He earned his PhD from Penn State.  His areas of professional interest included crash safety, shock and computational mechanics.  He wrote or co-authored more than 30 books and 300 articles in professional publications.  He founded Shock and Vibration, a journal published in association with SAVIAC and the limited distribution journal Critical Technology in Shock and Vibration, also in association with SAVIAC. He was the editor-in-chief of the International Journal of Finite Elements in Analysis and Design.

Professor Pilkey was a Fellow of the American Society of Mechanical Engineers.

External links
  Memoriam.

Selected publications

 Pilkey, Walter,Formulas for Stress, Strain, and Structural Matrices, Wiley, 2nd edition (November 11, 2004), 
Pilkey, Walter, Pilkey, Deborah, Peterson's Stress Concentration Factors, Wiley, 3rd edition (January 14, 2008), 
Pilkey, Walter, Analysis and Design of Elastic Beams: Computational Methods, Wiley, (June 3, 2002), 

University of Virginia faculty
American mechanical engineers
1936 births
2007 deaths
20th-century American engineers